"Caught Up in the Rapture" is a 1986 ballad song by American R&B/soul singer Anita Baker. It was released as the follow-up single after "Sweet Love" from her album Rapture.

Chart performance
"Caught Up in the Rapture" was Baker's third top ten R&B single, peaking at number six on the Billboard Hot Black Singles chart, and number nine on the Billboard Adult Contemporary Singles chart. It was also a #37 pop hit on the Billboard Hot 100 charts.

Personnel 
 Lead and backing vocals: Anita Baker
 Drums: Arthur Marbury
 Percussion: Lawrence Fratangelo
 Bass: David B. Washington
 Guitar: Michael J. Powell
 Keyboards: Vernon D. Fails
 Arrangements by Sir Gant

Charts

Weekly charts

Year-end charts

References

External links
 [ AMG Allmusic]
 www.AnitaBaker.com

1986 singles
1985 songs
Anita Baker songs
Soul ballads
Contemporary R&B ballads
1980s ballads
Elektra Records singles
Song recordings produced by Michael J. Powell